Egypt is a small rural community approximately twelve miles east of Centerville in eastern Leon County. Settlement probably occurred in the late 1800s or early 1900s. In the 1930s a school served area families. Though the community was still shown on highway maps in 2000, no population figures were available. It is now considered a ghost town.

References

Kingston, Mike (ed.). "Town Names: Past and Present", Texas Almanac
Jasinski, Laurie E. (ed.). "Egypt, TX (Leon County)", Texas State Historical Association

Geography of Leon County, Texas
Ghost towns in East Texas